The 1977–78 Macedonian Republic League was the 34th since its establishment. FK Tikvesh won their 2nd championship title.

Participating teams

Final table

External links
SportSport.ba
Football Federation of Macedonia 

Macedonian Football League seasons
Yugo
3